Dorsum Niggli is a wrinkle ridge at  in Oceanus Procellarum on the Moon. It is 50 km long and was named after Paul Niggli in 1976.

Niggli